The Land Trust is a British charity, based in Warrington, Cheshire, which owns or manages open spaces restored from derelict land for public benefit. Its vision is "to improve the quality of people’s lives by creating sustainable, high quality green spaces that deliver environmental, social and economic benefits".

The Land Restoration Trust was created in 2004 to ensure that restoration projects for derelict land would have a long-term future. It became independent as The Land Trust in 2009/10.

Projects

Spaces include:
Northumberlandia, a land sculpture near Cramlington, Northumberland
Phoenix Park, Thurnscoe, on the former Hickleton Main Colliery in South Yorkshire
Braeburn Park, a nature reserve in London Borough of Bexley

The Land Trust is working with Buglife in a project to conserve pollinating insects, initially on the trust's Yorkshire sites.

References

Further reading

External links

Charities based in Cheshire
Environmental charities based in the United Kingdom
Ecological restoration